Lalthakima (born 9 April 1997) is an Indian professional footballer who plays as a defender for Aizawl.

Career
Born in Mizoram, Lalthakima made his professional debut for Aizawl in the I-League on 26 March 2016 against the reigning champions, Mohun Bagan. He came on as a 15th minute substitute as Aizawl won 2–1.

Kerala Blasters
On 23 July 2017, Lalthakima was selected in the 10th round of the 2017–18 ISL Players Draft by the Kerala Blasters for the 2017–18 Indian Super League season.

Career statistics

Honours

Club
Aizawl
I-League: 2016–17

References

External links 
 Aizawl Football Club Profile.
 Indian Super League Profile.

1996 births
Living people
Indian footballers
Aizawl FC players
Lalthakima
Association football defenders
Footballers from Mizoram
I-League players